Sir Peter Nicholas Francis, KC, styled Mr Justice Francis, is a British High Court judge.

Early life
Francis was educated at Radley College before going up to Downing College, Cambridge.

Career 
Francis was called to the Bar by Middle Temple in 1981, and became a King's Counsel in 2002. He specialised in family law, and became head of chambers at 29 Bedford Row in 2002.

He was appointed as an Assistant Recorder in 1999 and later a Recorder to sit on the South Eastern Circuit in July, 2000. 

He would be appointed as a Deputy High Court judge in 2011. He would later be appointed as a High Court judge in 2016 and assigned to the Family Division by the Lord Chief Justice. He received the customary knighthood from Queen Elizabeth II on the 16th of December 2016 in the 2016 Special Honours.

Notable cases 
In 2017, he ruled on the controversial best interests case of Charlie Gard.

References

1958 births
Living people
People educated at Radley College
Alumni of Downing College, Cambridge
Members of the Middle Temple
Family Division judges
Welsh barristers
21st-century King's Counsel
Knights Bachelor